Uttar Khan is a Thana of Dhaka District in the Division of Dhaka, Bangladesh. Its area is 20.09 km2. It is bounded by Tongi Khal (canal) and Gazipur Sadar Upazila on the north, Khilkhet and Dakshinkhan thanas on the south, Balu River and Kaliganj (Gazipur) upazila on the east, Gazipur Sadar upazila and Daskhinkhan thanas on the west.

See also
Upazilas of Bangladesh
Districts of Bangladesh
Divisions of Bangladesh

References

Thanas of Dhaka
Areas under Dhaka-18 constituency